Susana González (born Susana Alejandra González del Río on October 2, 1973 in Calera de Víctor Rosales, Zacatecas, Mexico) is a Mexican actress and model.

Biography 
González was born October 2, 1973 in Calera de Víctor Rosales, Zacatecas, Mexico. She is the daughter of Refugio González and Elvira del Río, and has a brother, Jose, and a sister, Erika. González wanted to be an actress from a very young age. She was offered a chance to study acting in Mexico City after winning a beauty contest in her home town.

When González was 18 years old, she won a scholarship to Televisa's acting academy, the Centro de Educación Artística. She was so determined to be an actress that she decided to move from Calera to Mexico City. She was encouraged by the enormous support she received from her family.

Her roles have ranged from a ruthless woman in Amigas y rivales to a sweet and naive girl in Entre el amor y el odio. In 2004 she starred in Al otro lado, a movie co-produced by Spain, Morocco and Mexico. This was an excellent chance for her to be known worldwide. In 2005 she was offered work in Miami, Florida nearly for a year and a half to shoot the telenovela El amor no tiene precio. This was a difficult time for her due to the time she had to spend far from home.

In 2006 she took part in Bailando por la Boda de Mis Sueños, a reality dancing show. She did not win the first place but won the hearts of the people and judges because of her charisma, sweetness, tenacity, and will to succeed. In 2007 she played the main role of Camila Darien in the telenovela Pasión, produced by Carla Estrada.

In S.O.S.: Sexo y otros Secretos, she played the role of Tania. This TV show offered a perspective of a group of women with five different lives to offer insight into the private side of womanhood.

In 2011, she joined Jose Ron, Jorge Salinas and Ana Brenda Contreras in La que no podía amar. She played Cynthia Montero, a beautiful and boastful young lady who finds out she is a daughter of a maid (portrayed by Ana Martín), which makes her a bastard, and her resentment towards her mother grows.

On June 24, 2013, it was confirmed that González (along with Guy Ecker) would star as the protagonist in Por siempre mi amor.

Personal life
González has two children with Luis Elias, a son Santiago and a daughter Susana.

Filmography

Film

Television roles

Awards and nominations

Premios ACE (Argentina)

Premios TVyNovelas

Premios People en Español

References

External links

Susana González at the Mexican Telenovela Database

1973 births
Living people
Mexican telenovela actresses
Mexican television actresses
Mexican film actresses
Mexican female models
Actresses from Zacatecas
20th-century Mexican actresses
21st-century Mexican actresses
People from Zacatecas